Daily Intelligencer may refer to:

Daily Intelligencer (Atlanta) (1849–1871), a defunct newspaper of Atlanta, Georgia
The Intelligencer (Belleville, Ontario), (est. 1834), also known as the Daily Intelligencer in the 1890s
The Intelligencer (Doylestown, Pennsylvania)
Daily Intelligencer (Harrisburg) (1841-1847), a defunct newspaper of Pennsylvania
A predecessor of the Seattle Post-Intelligencer in Seattle, Washington
A predecessor of The Intelligencer and Wheeling News Register in Ogden, West Virginia
Intelligencer (website) or Daily Intelligencer, a blog within New York magazine

See also
Intelligencer (disambiguation)